Lamentation of Christ (also known as Glimm Lamentation) is an oil-on-panel painting of the common subject of the Lamentation of Christ by the German Renaissance artist Albrecht Dürer, executed around 1500 and now in the Alte Pinakothek of Munich, Germany.

The work was commissioned by goldsmith Jakob Glimm as a memorial of his first wife, Margaret Holzmann, who had died in 1500.  The removal of later re-painting in 1924 showed the original figures of the donors (Glimm and his three sons) and of the dead woman, depicted in far smaller proportions than the religious characters.

Description
The painting shows the dead Jesus, held by Joseph of Arimathea and surrounded by the Pious Women, including an aged and  distraught Mary.  In the right part are three standing characters depicted on a diagonal line: from top, St. John the Evangelist, Mary Magdalene, and Nicodemus, the last two holding vases which contained balms used to prepare the corpse for the burial.

See also
Lamentation of Christ (Dürer, Nuremberg)

References

Sources 

Paintings by Albrecht Dürer
1500 paintings
Collection of the Alte Pinakothek
Paintings of the Virgin Mary
Paintings about death
Paintings depicting Mary Magdalene
Dürer, Munich